Judge Hickey may refer to:

John J. Hickey (1911–1970), judge of the United States Court of Appeals for the Tenth Circuit
Susan O. Hickey (born 1955), judge of the United States District Court for the Western District of Arkansas
William F. Hickey Jr. (1929–2016), judge of the Connecticut Superior Court
William J. Hickey (1873–1953), judge of the New York Supreme Court